Vladimirovka is a rural locality (a village) in Pisarevsky Selsoviet, Sharansky District, Bashkortostan, Russia. The population was 37 as of 2010. There is 1 street.

Geography 
Vladimirovka is located 30 km north of Sharan (the district's administrative centre) by road. Sakty is the nearest rural locality.

References 

Rural localities in Sharansky District